Steven Frederic Seagal (born April 10, 1952) is an American and naturalized Russian actor, screenwriter, and martial artist. A 7th-dan black belt in aikido, he began his adult life as a martial arts instructor in Japan and eventually ended up running his father-in-law's dojo. He later moved to Los Angeles where he had the same profession. In 1988, Seagal made his acting debut in Above the Law. By 1991, he had starred in four films.

In 1992, he played Navy SEAL counter-terrorist expert Casey Ryback in Under Siege. During the latter half of the 1990s, Seagal starred in three more feature films and the direct-to-video film The Patriot. Subsequently, his career shifted to mostly direct-to-video productions. He has since appeared in films and reality shows, including Steven Seagal: Lawman, which depicted Seagal performing duties as a reserve deputy sheriff.

Seagal is a guitarist and has released two studio albums, Songs from the Crystal Cave and Mojo Priest, and performed on the scores of several of his films. He has worked with Stevie Wonder and Tony Rebel, who both performed on his debut album. He has been involved in a line of "therapeutic oil" products and energy drinks. Seagal is an environmentalist, animal rights activist, and supporter of 14th Dalai Lama Tenzin Gyatso. He is a supporter of Vladimir Putin, to whom he once referred as "one of the great living world leaders". He was granted both Russian and Serbian citizenship in 2016. In 2018, he was appointed Russia's special envoy to the U.S.

From 1996 to 2018, multiple women accused Seagal of sexual harassment or assault.

Early life 
Steven Frederic Seagal was born in Lansing, Michigan, on April 10, 1952, the son of a medical technician and a mathematics teacher. His mother was of Irish descent, while his father was Jewish. His paternal grandparents were Russian Jewish immigrants. During an interview for the Russian talk show, Let Them Talk, Seagal stated that he has paternal ancestors from the Siberian city of Vladivostok, as well as Belarus and Saint Petersburg. He stated that genetic testing determined that he has Yakut and Buryat ancestry as well.

When he was five years old, he moved with his parents to Fullerton, California. His mother later told People magazine that prior to the move Seagal was frail and suffered from asthma: "He was a puny kid back then. But he really thrived after the move [from Michigan]." Seagal attended Buena Park High School in Buena Park, California, and Fullerton College between 1970 and 1971. As a teen, he spent much time in his garage listening to loud rock music. While working with a friendly old Japanese man at a dojo in Garden Grove he was encouraged to visit Japan.

Martial arts 
Seagal moved to Japan at some point between 1971 and 1973. By 1974, he had returned to California. That year he met Miyako Fujitani, a second-degree black belt and daughter of an Osaka aikido master who had come to Los Angeles to teach aikido. When Miyako returned to Osaka, Seagal went with her. In 1975 they married and had a son, Kentaro, and a daughter, Ayako. He taught at the school owned by Miyako's family. As of 1990, Miyako and her brother still taught there, and her mother was the chairwoman.

Seagal returned to Taos, New Mexico, with his student (and later film stuntman) Craig Dunn, where they opened a dojo, although Seagal spent much of his time pursuing other ventures. After another period in Japan, Seagal returned to the U.S. in 1983 with senior student Haruo Matsuoka. They opened an aikido dojo, initially in North Hollywood, California, but later moved it to the city of West Hollywood. Seagal left Matsuoka in charge of the dojo, which the latter ran until the two parted ways in 1997.

Seagal helped train Brazilian mixed martial artist Lyoto Machida, who credited Seagal for helping him perfect the front kick that he used to knock out Randy Couture at UFC 129 in May 2011.

Career

1987–2002 
In 1987, Seagal began work on his first film, Above the Law (titled Nico in Europe), with director Andrew Davis.  Following its success, Seagal's subsequent movies were Hard to Kill, Marked for Death, and Out for Justice; all were box office hits, making him an action hero. Later, he achieved wider, mainstream success in 1992 with the release of Under Siege (1992), which reunited Seagal with director Andrew Davis.

On April 20, 1991, Seagal hosted Season 16 Episode 18 of Saturday Night Live. The series' long-time executive producer Lorne Michaels and cast-members David Spade and Tim Meadows called Seagal the show's worst host ever. Spade and Meadows cited Seagal's humorlessness, his ill-treatment of the cast and writers, and his refusal to do a "Hans and Franz" sketch because the skit's title characters had previously said that they could "beat up Steven Seagal". Seagal has never been invited back to the show. Meadows commented, "He didn't realize that you can't tell somebody they're stupid on Wednesday and expect them to continue writing for you on Saturday." The cast and crew's difficulties with Seagal were later echoed on-air by Michaels during guest host Nicolas Cage's monologue in the September 26, 1992, Season 18 premiere. When Cage worried that he would do so poorly that the audience would regard him as "the biggest jerk who's ever been on the show", Michaels replied: "No, no. That would be Steven Seagal."

Seagal directed and starred in On Deadly Ground (1994), featuring Michael Caine, R. Lee Ermey, and Billy Bob Thornton in minor supporting roles. The film emphasized environmental and spiritual themes, signaling a break with his previous persona as a genre-ready inner-city cop. On Deadly Ground was poorly received by critics, especially denouncing Seagal's long environmental speech in the film. Regardless, Seagal considers it one of the most important and relevant moments in his career. Seagal followed this with a sequel to one of his most successful films, Under Siege, titled Under Siege 2: Dark Territory (1995).

In 1996, he had a role in the Kurt Russell film Executive Decision, portraying a special ops soldier who appears in only the film's first 45 minutes. The same year, he filmed a police drama The Glimmer Man (1996). In another environmentally conscious and commercially unsuccessful film, Fire Down Below (1997), he played an EPA Office of Enforcement and Compliance Assurance agent fighting industrialists dumping toxic waste in the Kentucky hills.

In 1998, Seagal made The Patriot, another environmental thriller which was his first direct-to-video release in the United States (though it was released theatrically in most of the world). Seagal produced this film with his own money, and the film was shot on-location on and near his farm in Montana.

After producing Prince of Central Park, Seagal returned to cinema screens with the release of Exit Wounds in March 2001. The film had fewer martial arts scenes than Seagal's previous films, but it was a commercial success, taking almost $80 million worldwide. It was considered at the time to be a "comeback" for Seagal. However, Seagal was unable to capitalize on this success and his next two projects were both critical and commercial failures. The movie Ticker, co-starring Tom Sizemore and Dennis Hopper, was filmed in San Francisco before Exit Wounds, and went straight to DVD. Half Past Dead, starring hip hop star Ja Rule, made less than $20 million worldwide.

2003 to present day: direct-to-video films and television 
Other than his role as a villain in Robert Rodriguez's Machete (2010), almost all the films Seagal has made since the latter half of 2001 have been released direct-to-video (DTV) in North America, with some theatrical releases to other countries around the world. Seagal is credited as a producer and sometimes a writer on many of these DTV movies, which include Black Dawn, Belly of the Beast, Out of Reach, Submerged, Kill Switch, Urban Justice, Pistol Whipped, Against the Dark, Driven to Kill, A Dangerous Man, Born to Raise Hell, and The Keeper. Beyond the Law (2019) is one of Seagal's very few movies to have enjoyed a theater release in North America since Machete.

In 2009, A&E Network premiered the reality television series Steven Seagal: Lawman, focusing on Seagal as a deputy in Jefferson Parish, Louisiana.

In the 2010s, Seagal's direct-to-video films increasingly started to become ensemble pieces, with Seagal playing minor or supporting roles, despite the fact that he often received top billing. Maximum Conviction, Force of Execution, Gutshot Straight, Code of Honor, Sniper Special Ops, The Asian Connection, The Perfect Weapon, Cartels, and China Salesman all exemplify this trend. This has led some commentators to criticize Seagal for his low-effort participation in movies which heavily promote his involvement.

In 2011, Seagal produced and starred in an American television action series entitled True Justice. The series first aired on Nitro, a TV station in Spain, on May 12, 2011. It premiered in the UK on 5 USA, with the first episode broadcast July 20, 2011. April 26, 2012 the series was renewed for a second season airing on ReelzChannel July 4, 2012. In the UK, True Justice has been repackaged as a series of DVD "movies," with each disc editing together two episodes.

Other ventures

Music 

Seagal plays the guitar. His songs have been featured in several of his movies, including Fire Down Below and Ticker. Among his extensive collection are guitars previously owned by "the Kings"; Albert, BB, and Freddie, as well as Bo Diddley, Stevie Ray Vaughan, Buddy Guy, Howlin' Wolf, Muddy Waters, and Jimi Hendrix.

In 2005, he released his first album, Songs from the Crystal Cave, which has a mix of pop, world, country, and blues music. It features duets with Tony Rebel, Lt. Stichie, Lady Saw, and Stevie Wonder. The soundtrack to Seagal's 2005 film Into the Sun features several songs from the album. One of his album tracks, "Girl It's Alright", was also released as a single in several countries alongside an accompanying music video. Seagal's second album, titled Mojo Priest, was released in April 2006. Subsequently, he spent the summer of 2006 touring the United States and Europe with his band, Thunderbox, in support of the album.

Law enforcement work 
Seagal has been a Reserve Deputy Chief in the Jefferson Parish, Louisiana, Sheriff's Office. In the late 1980s, after teaching the deputies martial arts, unarmed combat, and marksmanship, then-sheriff Harry Lee (1932–2007) asked Seagal to join the force. Seagal's rank in Louisiana was ceremonial.

Steven Seagal: Lawman, a series which follows his work in the Jefferson Parish Sheriff's Office, premiered on A&E on December 2, 2009. Seagal stated that "I've decided to work with A&E on this series now because I believe it's important to show the nation all the positive work being accomplished here in Louisiana—to see the passion and commitment that comes from the Jefferson Parish Sheriff's Office in this post-Katrina environment." The series premiere drew 3.6 million viewers, ranking as best season opener for any original A&E series ever.

On April 14, 2010, the series was suspended by Jefferson Parish Sheriff Newell Normand due to a sexual trafficking lawsuit filed against Seagal. The suit was later dropped. A&E resumed the show for the second season, which began on October 6, 2010.

Production on Season 3 started in February 2011, with a change of location from Louisiana to Maricopa County, Arizona.  Two episodes were scheduled to be aired, beginning on January 4, 2012. Shortly before the episodes were to be aired, Season 3 was suspended, with no explanations given. Season 3 premiered on January 2, 2014, but the show was not renewed for a fourth season.

In October 2011, Seagal was sworn-in as the Sheriff department’s deputy sheriff of Hudspeth County, Texas, a law department responsible for patrolling a 98-mile stretch of the Texas-Mexico border.

Business ventures 
In 2005, Seagal Enterprises began to market an energy drink known as "Steven Seagal's Lightning Bolt", but it has since been discontinued. Seagal has also marketed an aftershave called "Scent of Action", and a range of knives and weapons.

In 2013, Seagal joined newly formed Russian firearms manufacturer ORSIS, representing the company in both a promotional capacity as well as lobbying for the easement of US import restrictions on Russian sporting firearms. It was also announced he would work with the company to develop a signature long-range rifle known provisionally as "ORSIS by Steven Seagal".

Personal life 
Seagal has an extensive sword collection, and at one time had a custom gun made for him once a month.

Residences 
Seagal owns a home in the Mandeville Canyon section of Los Angeles, and a home in Louisiana.

Religion 
Seagal is a Buddhist. In February 1997, Lama Penor Rinpoche from Palyul monastery announced that Seagal was a tulku, and specifically the reincarnation of Chungdrag Dorje, a 17th-century terton (treasure revealer) of the Nyingma, the oldest sect of Tibetan Buddhism.

Citizenship 

Seagal reportedly holds citizenships in three countries: the United States, Serbia, and Russia. Born in the United States, he possesses jus soli U.S. citizenship. He was granted Serbian citizenship on January 11, 2016, following several visits to the country, and has been asked to teach aikido to the Serbian Special Forces.

Seagal was granted Russian citizenship on November 3, 2016; according to government spokesman Dmitry Peskov, "He was asking quite insistently and over a lengthy period to be granted citizenship." While various media have cited Seagal and President Vladimir Putin as friends and Seagal stated that he "would like to consider [Putin] as a brother", Putin has distanced himself from Seagal; Peskov is reported to have said: "I wouldn't necessarily say he's a huge fan, but he's definitely seen some of his movies."

Relationships and family 

While in Japan, Seagal married his first wife, Miyako Fujitani, the daughter of an aikido instructor. With Fujitani, he had a son, actor and model Kentaro Seagal, and a daughter, writer and actress Ayako Fujitani. Seagal left Miyako to move back to the United States.

During this time, he met actress and model Kelly LeBrock, with whom he began an affair that led to Fujitani's granting him a divorce. Seagal was briefly married to actress Adrienne La Russa in 1984, but that marriage was annulled the same year over concerns that his divorce had not yet been finalized. LeBrock gave birth to Seagal's daughter Annaliza in early 1987. Seagal and LeBrock married in September 1987 and their son Dominic was born in June 1990. Their daughter Arissa was born in 1993. The following year, LeBrock filed for divorce citing "irreconcilable differences".

Seagal is married to Mongolian Erdenetuya Batsukh, better known as "Elle". They have one son together, Kunzang. From an early age, Elle trained as a dancer at the Children's Palace in Ulaanbaatar, Mongolia. After her graduation from high school and the Children's Palace, she pursued a career as a professional dancer. She won a number of dancing contests and was considered the top female dancer in Mongolia, excelling at ballroom dancing in particular. Elle first met Seagal in 2001, when she worked as his interpreter during his visit to Mongolia.

Seagal has seven children from four relationships, two grandchildren by his eldest son, Kentaro and one granddaughter by his daughter Ayako Fujitani. In addition to his biological offspring, Seagal is the guardian of Yabshi Pan Rinzinwangmo, the only child of the 10th Panchen Lama of Tibet. When she studied in the United States, Seagal was her minder and bodyguard.

Allegations and lawsuits

Early 1990s 
In May 1991 (during the filming of Out for Justice), Warner Bros. employees Raenne Malone, Nicole Selinger, and Christine Keeve accused Seagal of sexual harassment. In return for remaining silent, Malone and another woman received around $50,000 each in an out-of-court settlement. Around the same time, at least four actresses claimed that Seagal had made sexual advances, typically during late-night "casting sessions".

In another incident, Jenny McCarthy claimed that Seagal asked her to undress during an audition for Under Siege 2.

1995 lawsuit 
In 1995, Seagal was charged with employment discrimination, sexual harassment, and breach of contract. Cheryl Shuman filed a case against Seagal, accusing him of threatening and beating her during the filming of On Deadly Ground. In August 1995, Los Angeles Superior Court Judge Hiroshi Fujisaki dismissed the case, calling the claims "repetitive and unintelligible".

2010 lawsuit 
On April 12, 2010, 23-year-old Kayden Nguyen filed a lawsuit against Seagal in a Los Angeles County Superior Court, requesting more than one million dollars in damages. In her suit, Nguyen alleged Seagal engaged in sexual harassment, the illegal trafficking of females for sex, failure to prevent sexual harassment, and wrongful termination. Seagal denied the allegations, but his reality show Steven Seagal: Lawman was suspended while his attorneys resolved the case.  On July 14, 2010, three months after Nguyen filed her suit, she withdrew her claim without explanation.

2011 lawsuit 
On August 30, 2011, Jesus Sanchez Llovera filed a lawsuit against Seagal over his part in a Maricopa county police raid with heavy weapons (notably including an army surplus tank) of Llovera's residence for suspicion of cockfighting. The incident was taped for Seagal's A&E reality show Steven Seagal: Lawman. Llovera was seeking $100,000 for damages caused during the raid and a letter of apology from Seagal to Llovera's children for the death of their family pet. Llovera claimed that his 11-month-old puppy was shot and killed during the raid. Llovera failed to file court-ordered paperwork after his attorney withdrew from the case and the lawsuit was dismissed in January 2013.

2017 allegations
In 2017, actress Portia de Rossi accused Seagal of sexually harassing her during a movie audition. De Rossi alleged that during an audition in Seagal's office, he told her "how important it was to have chemistry off-screen" before unzipping his pants.

On an April 18 appearance on Jimmy Kimmel Live!, Katherine Heigl alleged on the final day of shooting for Under Siege 2 that Seagal told her that he had girlfriends the same age as the 16-year-old Heigl. Kimmel responded by displaying a photo from the film's promotional tour showing Seagal's hand on Heigl's chest while they posed for a photo. 
On November 9, 2017, Dutch model Faviola Dadis posted a statement on her Instagram account stating that she also had been sexually assaulted by Seagal years earlier.

2018 allegations and investigation
On January 15, 2018, actress Rachel Grant publicly accused Seagal of sexually assaulting her in 2002, during pre-production on his direct-to-video film, Out for a Kill (2003), stating that she lost her job on the film after the incident. In February 2018, the Los Angeles County District Attorney's office acknowledged that it was reviewing a potential sex-abuse case involving Seagal. In March 2018, Regina Simons publicly claimed that in 1993, when she was 18, Seagal raped her at his home when she arrived for what she thought was a wrap party for the movie On Deadly Ground.

2020 federal securities violation settlement 
On February 27, 2020, the U.S. Securities and Exchange Commission announced settled charges against Seagal for failing to disclose payments he received for promoting an investment in an initial coin offering (ICO) conducted by Bitcoiin2Gen (B2G). Seagal was promised $250,000 in cash and $750,000 worth of B2G tokens in exchange for his social media promotions and a press release in which he "wholeheartedly" endorsed the ICO, which violated the anti-touting provisions of federal securities laws. Without admitting or denying the SEC's findings, Seagal agreed to pay $157,000 in disgorgement, representing the actual payments he received for his promotions, plus prejudgment interest and a $157,000 penalty. Seagal also agreed not to promote any securities, digital or otherwise, for three years.

Victim of attempted extortion 
Steven Seagal became embroiled in a legal case involving film producer Julius R. Nasso after Nasso attempted to extort Seagal. Nasso produced seven of Seagal's films beginning with Marked for Death in 1990. The two "became best friends", according to Seagal, and formed Seagal/Nasso Productions together. Their relationship became strained, however, and their partnership ended in 2000. Believing that Seagal owed him $3 million in compensation for backing out of a four-film deal, Nasso enlisted members of the Gambino crime family to threaten Seagal in an attempt to recoup money Nasso allegedly lost.

Gambino family captain Anthony Ciccone first visited Seagal in Toronto during the filming of Exit Wounds in October 2000. In January 2001, Primo Cassarino and other gangsters picked up Seagal by car to bring him to a meeting with Ciccone at a Brooklyn restaurant. At the meeting, Ciccone reportedly told Seagal that he had a choice of making four promised movies with Nasso or paying Nasso a penalty of $150,000 per movie, and that if Seagal refused, Ciccone would kill him.

Seagal, who later claimed that he brought a handgun to the meeting, was able to stall Ciccone and escape the meeting unharmed. Ciccone and Cassarino again visited Seagal at his home in Los Angeles the following month. In the spring of 2001, Seagal sought out another mobster, Genovese crime family captain Angelo Prisco, to act as a "peacemaker". He visited Prisco in prison at Rahway, New Jersey and paid Prisco's lawyer $10,000.

On March 17, 2003, Cassarino, Ciccone and others were convicted of labor racketeering, extortion, and 63 other counts under the Racketeer Influenced and Corrupt Organizations Act. Seagal testified for the prosecution about the mobsters' extortion attempt. Nasso pleaded guilty to the charge of extortion conspiracy in August 2003. In February 2004, he was sentenced to a year and a day in prison, fined $75,000 and ordered to take mental health counselling on release from jail. In January 2008, Nasso agreed to drop a $60 million lawsuit against Seagal for an alleged breach of contract when the two settled out of court.

Conflicts with stuntmen
Seagal has been accused by former stunt performers who have worked with him, including Kane Hodder, Stephen Quadros, and Gene LeBell, of intentionally hitting stuntmen during scenes.

Additionally, while serving as stunt coordinator for Out for Justice, LeBell allegedly got into an on-set altercation with Seagal over his mistreatment of some of the film's stunt performers. After the actor claimed that, due to his aikido training, he was "immune" to being choked unconscious, LeBell offered Seagal the opportunity to prove it. LeBell is said to have placed his arms around Seagal's neck, and once Seagal said "go", proceeded to choke him unconscious, with Seagal losing control of his bowels. Seagal bodyguard and stuntman Steven Lambert stated he was present and said that a confrontation did happen, during which Seagal elbowed LeBell before he could lock the hold on Seagal, after which LeBell flipped Seagal.

LeBell was requested to confirm the on-set incident publicly in an interview with Ariel Helwani in 2012, but he avoided answering the question, albeit implying that it was true. He was quoted as "When we had a little altercation or difference of opinion, there were thirty stuntmen and cameramen that were watching. Sometimes Steven has a tendency to cheese off the wrong people, and you can get hurt doing that."

On the other hand, when Seagal was asked about the incident, he directly denied the allegations, calling LeBell a "sick, pathological scumbag liar", and offered the name of a witness who could prove LeBell had fabricated the entire story. The claim garnered a heated response from LeBell's trainee Ronda Rousey, who said that Seagal was the one lying, and declared "If [Seagal] says anything bad about Gene to my face, I'd make him crap his pants a second time."

Authentic or not, the reports of this incident led LeBell to be counted in 1992 as an additional member of Robert Wall's "Dirty Dozen", a group of martial artists willing to answer to a public challenge made by Seagal. LeBell however declined to participate, revealing the feud with Seagal was hurting him professionally. He did however criticize Seagal for his treatment of stuntmen, and left open the possibility of a professional fight if Seagal wanted to do it.

Allegations of mistreatment towards stuntmen have continued throughout Seagal's later career, with both stuntman Peter Harris Kent (Arnold Schwarzenegger's stunt double) and Mike Leeder publicly criticizing his on-set antics. Actor John Leguizamo also claimed that during rehearsals on Executive Decision, in retaliation for laughing at him, Seagal caught him off guard and knocked him into a brick wall. Michael Jai White, who acted with him in a number of movies, stated that he routinely hit stunt men, and that he was known for it. He said they just accepted it. However, he stated that Seagal never hit him.

Political views and activism 
Seagal lent his voice as a narrator for an activist film project, Medicine Lake Video. The project seeks to protect sacred tribal ground near Seagal's ranch in Siskiyou County. He also wrote an open letter to the leadership of Thailand in 2003, urging them to enact a law to prevent the torture of baby elephants. In 1999, Seagal was awarded a PETA Humanitarian Award.

In a March 2014 interview with Rossiyskaya Gazeta, Seagal described Vladimir Putin as "one of the great living world leaders". He expressed support for the annexation of Crimea by Russia. In July 2014, following calls for a boycott, Seagal was dropped from the lineup of the August Blues Festival in Haapsalu, Estonia. The Estonian musician Tõnis Mägi, the minister of Foreign Affairs, Urmas Paet, and Parliament's Foreign Affairs chairman Marko Mihkelson had all condemned inviting Seagal into the country, with Paet saying, "Steven Seagal has tried to actively participate in politics during the past few months and has done it in a way which is unacceptable to the majority of the world that respects democracy and the rule of law."

In August 2014, Seagal appeared at a Night Wolves-organized show in Sevastopol, Crimea, supporting the Crimean annexation and depicting Ukraine as a country controlled by fascists. On November 3, Seagal was granted Russian citizenship by Putin. His views on Ukraine and Russian citizenship caused Ukraine to ban him from entering the country because he "committed socially dangerous actions".

Seagal visited the Republic of Azerbaijan in 2015 and met with the country's long-time president, Ilham Aliyev. Seagal has expressed support for Azerbaijan's territorial integrity and dispute with neighboring Armenia over the Nagorno-Karabakh conflict.

Seagal spoke out against the protests during the United States national anthem by professional athletes, stating, "I believe in free speech, I believe that everyone's entitled to their own opinion, but I don't agree that they should hold the United States of America or the world hostage by taking a venue where people are tuning in to watch a football game and imposing their political views." He also expressed skepticism of alleged Russian interference in the 2016 United States elections.

In 2017, Seagal collaborated with a former chair of the Arizona Republican Party, Tom Morrissey, in writing a self-published conspiracy thriller novel, The Way of the Shadow Wolves: The Deep State And The Hijacking Of America, which featured a Tohono Shadow Wolf tracker working for U.S. Immigration and Customs Enforcement to foil a plot by Mexican drug cartels and the "deep state" to smuggle in Islamist terrorists to the United States through the U.S.–Mexico border.

In October 2017, Seagal met with Philippine president Rodrigo Duterte while scouting for a location in Manila for his upcoming movie about illegal drugs and other crimes. During the visit, Seagal flashed Duterte's signature fist.

In 2021, Seagal gave a katana to Venezuelan President Nicolás Maduro as Russia's Foreign Affairs Ministry special envoy while visiting Canaima National Park. Maduro referred to Seagal as "my brother."

On May 30, 2021, the pro-Kremlin systemic opposition party A Just Russia — Patriots — For Truth announced that Seagal had received an official membership card to the party.

In March 2022, during the Russian invasion of Ukraine, Seagal visited Moscow where he organized his birthday party, attended by many people connected to Vladimir Putin, including some affected by international sanctions. This has been criticized as a dissenting action that came amidst the growing international boycott of Russia. In August 2022, he visited Olenivka in Donetsk Oblast, the site of the Olenivka prison massacre with Donetsk People's Republic leader Denis Pushilin, who claimed that Seagal was filming a documentary about the war in Donbass. Seagal also met with Leonid Slutsky. On February 27, 2023 he received the Russian Order of Friendship from Vladimir Putin for his "major contribution to the development of international cultural and humanitarian cooperation".

Stunts

Filmography

Films

Television

Awards and nominations

Discography 
 2005: Songs from the Crystal Cave
 2006: Mojo Priest

References

External links

 
 
 

 
1952 births
Living people
20th-century American guitarists
20th-century American male actors
20th-century American male musicians
21st-century American male actors
21st-century American male musicians
21st-century Russian male actors
21st-century Serbian male actors
Activists from California
American actor-politicians
American aikidoka
American Buddhists
American blues singers
American country singers
American deputy sheriffs
American drink industry businesspeople
American environmentalists
American expatriates in Japan
American kendoka
American male film actors
American male guitarists
American male judoka
American male karateka
American male singers
American people of Irish descent
American people of Jewish descent
American stunt performers
Businesspeople from California
Businesspeople from Louisiana
Businesspeople from Michigan
Converts to Buddhism
Country musicians from Louisiana
Country musicians from Michigan
Country musicians from Tennessee
Guitarists from Michigan
Male actors from Fullerton, California
Male actors from Lansing, Michigan
Naturalised citizens of Russia
Naturalized citizens of Serbia
Nyingma tulkus
Participants in American reality television series
People from Eltingville, Staten Island
People from Germantown, Tennessee
People from Jefferson Parish, Louisiana
People from Mandeville Canyon, Los Angeles
Tibetan Buddhists from the United States
People with multiple nationality